These are the most popular given names in the United States for all years of the 1940s.

1940 

Males
James
Robert
John
William
Richard
Charles
David
Thomas
Donald
Ronald

Females
Mary
Barbara
Patricia
Carol
Judith
Betty
Nancy
Maria
Margaret
Linda

1941 

Males
Robert
John
James
William
Richard
Charles
David
Thomas
Ronald
Donald

Females
Mary
Barbara
Patricia
Carol
Linda
Judith
Sandra
Maria
Betty
Nancy

1942 

Males
James
Robert
John
William
Richard
Charles
David
Thomas
Ronald
Joseph

Females
Mary
Barbara
Patricia
Carol
Linda
Nancy
Betty
Sandra
Maria
Judith

1943 

Males
James
Robert
John
William
Richard
David
Charles
Thomas
Ronald
Michael

Females
Mary
Barbara
Patricia
Linda
Carol
Sandra
Nancy; Sharon (tie)
Judith
Betty
-----

1944 

Males
Robert
James
John
William
Richard
David
Charles
Thomas
Michael
Ronald

Females
Mary
Barbara
Patricia
Linda
Carol
Nancy
Sandra
Sharon
Judith
Maria

1945 

Males
James
Robert
John
William
Richard
David
Thomas
Charles
Michael
Ronald

Females
Mary
Linda
Barbara
Patricia
Carol
Maria
Sandra
Nancy
Sharon
Susan

1946 

Males
James
Robert
John
William
Richard
David
Michael
Charles
Thomas
Ronald

Females
Mary
Linda
Patricia
Barbara
Carol
Susan
Nancy
Sandra
Maria
Sharon

1947 

Males
James
John
Robert
William
Richard
David
Michael
Thomas
Charles
Larry

Females
Linda
Mary
Patricia
Barbara
Sandra
Susan
Maria
Carol
Nancy
Sharon

1948 

Males
Robert
James
John
William
David
Richard
Michael
Thomas
Charles
Ronald

Females
Linda
Mary
Patricia
Barbara
Susan
Maria
Carol
Nancy; Sandra (tie)
Sharon
-----

1949 

Males
James
Robert
John
David; William (tie)
Michael
Richard
Thomas
Charles
Larry
-----

Females
Linda
Mary
Patricia
Barbara
Susan
Sandra
Maria
Nancy
Carol
Sharon

References 
 Most Popular 1000 Names of the 1940s from the Social Security Administration

1940s
1940s in the United States